Egon Boshof (born 13 January 1937 in Stolberg) is a German historian. From 1979 to 2002, he held the Chair for Medieval History at the University of Passau.

Works

Books 
 Erzbischof Agobard von Lyon. Leben und Werk (= Kölner Historische Abhandlungen. Bd. 17). Böhlau, Köln u. a. 1969,  (Zugleich: Köln, Univ., Diss., 1969). 
 mit Kurt Düwell und Hans Kloft: Grundlagen des Studiums der Geschichte. Eine Einführung. Böhlau, Köln u. a. 1973, . 
 Heinrich IV. Herrscher an einer Zeitenwende (= Persönlichkeit und Geschichte. Bd. 108/109). Muster-Schmidt, Göttingen u. a. 1979,  (2. überarbeitete Auflage. ebenda 1990). 
 Die Regesten der Bischöfe von Passau (= Regesten zur bayerischen Geschichte. Bd. 1–3). Herausgegeben von der Kommission für Bayerische Landesgeschichte. Beck, München; Band 1: 731–1206. 
1992, ; Band 2: 1206–1254. 1999, ; Band 3: 1254–1282. 2007, .

 Königtum und Königsherrschaft im 10. und 11. Jahrhundert (= Enzyklopädie deutscher Geschichte. Bd. 27). Oldenbourg, München 1993,  (2. Auflage. ebenda 1997; 3. aktualisierte und um einen Nachtrag erweiterte Auflage. ebenda 2010).
 Ludwig der Fromme (= Gestalten des Mittelalters und der Renaissance.). Primus Verlag, Darmstadt 1996, .
 Mitautor der Edition: Welt- und Kulturgeschichte. Epochen, Fakten, Hintergründe in 20 Bänden. Mit dem Besten aus der ZEIT. = Die ZEIT-Welt- und Kulturgeschichte. Zeitverlag Bucerius u. a., Hamburg 2006, für das Kapitel Was ist Geschichte.
 Europa im 12. Jahrhundert. Auf dem Weg in die Moderne. Kohlhammer Verlag, Stuttgart 2007, . (Rezension)
 Die Salier (= Kohlhammer-Urban-Taschenbücher. 387). 5. aktualisierte Auflage. Kohlhammer, Stuttgart 2008, .

Editor
 Regesta pontificum Romanorum. Vol. 10: Germania pontificia sive repertorium privilegiorum et litterarum a Romanis pontificibus ante annum MCLXXXXVIII Germaniae ecclesiis monasteriis civitatibus singulisque personis concessorum, Provincia Treverensis. Pars 1: Archidioecesis Treverensis. Vandenhoeck & Ruprecht, Göttingen 1992, . 
 Geschichte der Stadt Passau. Pustet, Regensburg 1999, .

References

Living people
1937 births
21st-century German historians
20th-century German historians